Rodrigo Federico Espíndola (29 July 1989 – 13 May 2016) was an Argentine professional footballer who played for Chacarita Juniors, Racing Club, and Nueva Chicago as a defender. He died on 13 May 2016 after being shot during a robbery.

References

1989 births
2016 deaths
Argentine footballers
Chacarita Juniors footballers
Racing Club de Avellaneda footballers
Nueva Chicago footballers
Argentine Primera División players
Primera Nacional players
Primera B Metropolitana players
Association football defenders
Male murder victims
People murdered in Argentina
Deaths by firearm in Argentina
Sportspeople from Buenos Aires Province